3,4-Ethylenedioxy-N-methylamphetamine (EDMA) is an entactogen drug of the methamphetamine class. It is an analogue of MDMA where the methylenedioxy ring has been replaced by an ethylenedioxy ring. EDMA was first synthesized by Alexander Shulgin. In his book PiHKAL, the dosage is listed as 150–250 mg, and the duration listed as 3–5 hours. According to Shulgin, EDMA produces a bare threshold consisting of paresthesia, nystagmus, and hypnogogic imagery, with few to no other effects. Scientific research has demonstrated that EDMA acts as a non-neurotoxic serotonin releasing agent with moderately diminished potency relative to MDMA, and with negligible effects on dopamine release.

References

External links 
 EDMA entry in PiHKAL
 MDMC (EDMA) entry in PiHKAL • info

Designer drugs
Benzodioxans
Serotonin releasing agents
Methamphetamines
Substituted amphetamines